Rob Moore may refer to:

 Rob Moore (politician) (born 1974), Canadian lawyer and politician
 Rob Moore (American football) (born 1968), American football player
 Rob Moore (field hockey) (born 1981), English field hockey player
 Rob Moore (executive) (born 1963), Esports Executive

See also
 Robert Moore (disambiguation)